Michael Geyer is a German historian, and Samuel N. Harper Professor Emeritus of German and European History, at University of Chicago. He is the recipient of the 2012 Axel Springer Berlin Prize and Senior Fellow at the American Academy in Berlin.
He graduated from Albert Ludwigs Universität Freiburg with a D.Phil.

Works
"Resistance as Ongoing Project: Visions of Order, Obligations to Strangers, Struggles for Civil Society," The Journal of Modern History Vol. 64, December 1992  
Michael Geyer and John W. Boyer, eds., Resistance against the Third Reich, 1933-1990, University of Chicago Press, 1994, 

"Insurrectionary Warfare: The German Debate about a Levée en Masse in October 1918," The Journal of Modern History Vol. 73, No. 3, September 2001

Michael Geyer and Sheila Fitzpatrick, eds., Beyond totalitarianism: Stalinism and Nazism compared, Cambridge University Press, 2009,

References

External links
http://chronicle.uchicago.edu/020606/gta-geyer.shtml

20th-century German historians
University of Chicago faculty
University of Freiburg alumni
Living people
German male non-fiction writers
Year of birth missing (living people)
21st-century German historians